Collabora Online is an open source online office suite built on LibreOffice Technology, enabling Web based collaborative real-time editing of word processing documents, spreadsheets, presentations, and vector graphics. Optional apps are available for desktops, laptops, tablets, smartphones and Chromebooks.

Collabora Online is developed by Collabora Productivity, a division of Collabora, who are a commercial partner with LibreOffice's parent organisation The Document Foundation (TDF). The TDF states that a majority of the LibreOffice software development is done by its commercial partners, Collabora, Red Hat, CIB, and Allotropia.

Features
Collabora Online can be accessed from any modern web browser without the need for plug-ins or add-ons, to edit or collaboratively edit in real-time; text documents, spreadsheets, presentations and vector graphics.

Collaborative functions include comments which other users can respond to, and document version history enabling the comparison of documents and restoring among other things. Advanced collaborative functions include integrated video calls or chat whilst collaboratively editing documents, features like these are possible as Collabora Online integrates with enterprise cloud solutions such as Nextcloud, ownCloud, Seafile and EGroupware.  Collabora Online can be integrated with any application.

Apps for desktops, laptops and mobile (tablets and smartphones, Chromebooks) 
Client apps are not required to access Collabora Online which only requires a modern web browser. Optional client apps are available for all popular device types.

Collabora Online and all the apps including Google's Android and ChromeOS, plus Apple's iOS and iPadOS share the same LibreOffice Technology core code with Online; Document fidelity between all of the apps and online is the same. Software coding improvements in the LibreOffice core normally benefits the apps and Collabora Online simultaneously. The apps work offline in full functionality without the need for a connection to the cloud or a server, although support for integrations with cloud storage services, such as Nextcloud and ownCloud is possible. The apps have touch-optimised interfaces, they scale appropriately across varying screen sizes such as smartphones and tablets. The ChromeOS app which is used in Chromebooks, Chromeboxes, Chromebases, Chromebits and tablets edits documents offline in the Play files folders. 

Desktop applications also share the same core software, LibreOffice Technology and are available for Windows, macOS and Linux, they work online or offline.

File Formats
Collabora Online supports the Open Document Format for Office Applications (ODF – odt, ODP, ODS, ODG), Microsoft formats (DOCX, PPTX, XLSX) as well as legacy Microsoft Office formats (doc, ppt, xls). Other formats supported include PDF, PNG, CSV, RTF, and EPUB. Microsoft Visio, Microsoft Publisher, Apple Keynote, Numbers, Pages, and other file formats can be imported.

Applications
The following applications are included in online and the apps for desktops, laptops and mobile (tablets, smartphones and Chromebooks). Note that in Online, nearly all Draw functionalitry is also integrated into Writer and Impress.
 Collabora Writer  text editor supporting .odt, .docx, .doc, .docm, .rtf. WYSIWYG editing, format and style options, comments and track changes.
 Collabora Calc  spreadsheet editor supporting .ods, .xlsx, .xls, .xlsm, .csv. Advanced formulas, pivot tables, HTML formula input, conditional formatting and data validation. Spreadsheets with up to 16k columns, charts, sparklines and hyperlinks. Advanced multi-column sort and filter advanced options. VBA Macro compatibility when it is enabled.
 Collabora Impress  presentation editor supporting .odp, .pptx, .ppt. Master slides, ability to add text, images, tables, SmartArt, speaker notes, custom timings and transitions.
 Collabora Draw  vector graphics editor supporting .odg, .vsd. For flyers, newsletters, brochures, diagrams, drawing shapes. (Version 6.4.7+). Ability to add text, charts, tables, links, fields, FontWork, text rotation, comments. Options to download as an image or pdf.

Server
Collabora Online allows collaborative real-time editing of word processing documents, spreadsheets, presentations and vector graphics. The server or servers can be hosted locally or with a provider, privately hosted cloud services allow data to remain under the control of the respective users. Collabora Productivity support Collabora Online server instances for Debian, Ubuntu CentOS, openSUSE, Univention Virtual Machines and Docker images. It is often integrated with file share and collaboration cloud platforms, such as Nextcloud, ownCloud, Seafile and EGroupware, which are functionally similar to Dropbox, Google Drive and Microsoft 365, these typically include email, contacts, calendar, file sync and share, calls, chat and video, with apps stores. Close integrations are possible, enabling things like the possibility to edit documents within a chatroom or a video call, as with Nextcloud's built-in video-conferencing tool Nextcloud Talk. Collabora Online server can integrate simultaneously with several cloud solutions such as aforementioned and also Moodle, Alfresco, Kolab, Mattermost, Sharepoint and others. 

The server can be installed from packages, or during development, for simplicity, from a docker image. The Docker website indicates that the Collabora Online Development Edition (CODE) Docker image has been downloaded 50 million times. A software development kit (SDK) including API specifications and integration instructions is available, along with sample integration code snippets in several software languages. 

Collaborative functions include comments which other users can respond to, document version history enabling the comparison of documents and their restoration, and other things. 

A remote work solution is made available by Canonical, Collabora, and Nextcloud that includes the Collabora Online office suite, it is called a Nextcloud Ubuntu Appliance and will install to Intel NUCs or ARM based Raspberry Pi 4s, it is pre-configured and automatically updates itself.

Digital Sovereignty 
Collabora Online is open source software and fully audit-able, self-hosted solutions can be implemented, and it is not necessary to depend on an account from a 3rd party provider to work with files. In July 2020, the European parliament published a briefing titled Digital sovereignty for Europe, detailing concerns that citizens, businesses and Member States of the European Union (EU) are losing control over their data, it explains the economic model used by Apple, Amazon, Facebook, Google and Microsoft is largely based on the collection and exploitation of online users' data. Judgements such as “Schrems II” show that it is delicate to rely on solutions from the large cloud providers when it comes to processing and storing sensitive personal data. Digital sovereignty has been an increasing concern in the EU for several reasons since the Patriot Act enacted in October 2001, the continuing legal privacy conflicts between the US CLOUD Act enacted March 2018, and the EU's General Data Protection Regulation (GDPR) implemented May 2018.

The French Ministry's IT infrastructure director stated safety of the data of their citizens and employees as a reason for deploying Nextcloud-based private cloud for the French Ministry of Interior. The Dutch Ministry of Education, the German federal government, and the Swedish federal government agencies are deploying Nextcloud-based private cloud for similar reasons and to increase competition.

Technology
The core of Collabora Online is written in C++ just like the core of LibreOffice. It uses the LibreOfficeKit, a programming interface that allows the reuse of most of the existing LibreOffice code and the saving, loading and rendering of documents. The basic principle of Collabora Online is that documents never leave the server. The parties working on the documents see tile-rendered images of the document and send their changes back to the server. The visible user interface of Collabora Online is written in JavaScript. For file access and authentication with a file hosting services, Collabora Online uses the WOPI protocol developed by Microsoft. This means that Collabora Online can - in theory - be used with any instance allowing a Microsoft 365 integration.

Reviews
Collabora Online was discussed in various online and print publications. In December 2016 the tech website Softpedia mentioned the availability of collaborative editing in version 2.0 and the integration with Owncloud, Nextcloud and other FSS solutions. The technology website ZDNet reported in June 2020 that Collabora Online from version 19 of Nextcloud will be delivered as a standard office package and that within the native video conferencing software Talk direct editing of documents is now possible. The technology blog OMG! Ubuntu! Covered the release of the Android & iOS apps pointing out the possibility to use them in offline mode. In September 2020 Linux Magazine compared Collabora Online with OnlyOffice, mentioning the flexibility and platform independence of both tools and pointing out the large set of features Collabora Online draws from LibreOffice.

History 
The former LibreOffice development team from SUSE joined Collabora in September 2013, forming the subsidiary Collabora Productivity. In 2015 Collabora and IceWarp announced the development of an enterprise-ready version of LibreOffice Online to compete with Google Docs and Office 365 (now called Microsoft 365). In December 2015, the company's partnership with ownCloud and release of CODE (Collabora Online Development Edition) was announced on Joinup. In November 2016, Nextcloud announced their work and integration with v2.0 of CODE and their future work plans for improving performance, scalability, security and capabilities with Collabora Online. In October 2020, Collabora announced the move of its work on Collabora Online from The Document Foundation infrastructure to GitHub. A development version of Collabora Online is available called Collabora Online Development Edition (CODE).

See also 

Collaborative software
 List of collaborative software
List of word processors
List of spreadsheet software
 List of desktop publishing software
List of office suites

References

External links
 

Office suites
Open-source office suites
Online office suites
Collaborative real-time editors
Office suites for Windows
Office suites for macOS
Office suites for Linux
Online word processors
Word processors
Free spreadsheet software
Online spreadsheets
Spreadsheet software for macOS
Spreadsheet software for Windows
Free presentation software
Presentation software
Presentation software for macOS
Presentation software for Windows
Desktop publishing software
Desktop publishing software for Linux
Desktop publishing software for macOS
Desktop publishing software for Windows
Free desktop publishing software
Free vector graphics editors
Document management systems
LibreOffice
Free PDF software
Free software programmed in C++
Free software programmed in JavaScript
Office software that uses GTK
Software using the Mozilla license
2016 software
Collabora
Cloud computing
Free software for cloud computing
Collaborative software
Open-source cloud applications
Free_groupware
Web_applications
Rich web applications
Cross-platform software
Cross-platform free software
Software forks
Formerly proprietary software
Linux word processors
macOS word processors
Windows word processors
Unix software
IOS software
Android (operating system) software
iPadOS software
macOS software
Spreadsheet software